The Cimarron Turnpike is a toll road in north-central Oklahoma. The route travels , from an interchange with Interstate 35 (I-35) north of Perry, to Westport, just west of Tulsa. The route also consists of a  spur which runs from the mainline southwest to an interchange with U.S. Route 177 (US-177) north of Stillwater.

The entirety of the Cimarron Turnpike is concurrent with US-412 except for the Stillwater spur. At either end of the Turnpike, US-412 begins (or ends, depending on direction) a concurrency with US-64.

The Cimarron Turnpike opened to traffic in 1975. The US-412 designation was applied to the Cimarron Turnpike in 1988.

Route description

The Cimarron Turnpike, carrying US-412, passes through Noble, Payne, and Pawnee Counties. The highway heads east from I-35 to its first interchange, Exit 3, which provides access to US-77. The first mainline toll plaza is just west of Exit 15, a cloverleaf interchange with no straight-line ramps (forcing all traffic getting on or off to pass through the toll plaza) connecting the turnpike to US-177. East of the US-177 interchange, the highway curves to the south, crossing Black Bear Creek. US-412 then meets US-64 once again, interchanging with it at Exit 23 east of Morrison. The turnpike then turns back east, with a spur route (accessible only from the westbound turnpike) branching off to the southwest toward Stillwater. The Lone Chimney service plaza, a twenty-four-hour concession area, is located in the median of the turnpike east of the interchange with the spur.

South of Pawnee lies an interchange (Exit 37) with SH-18. Just south of Hallett, a second mainline toll plaza sits just west of the SH-99 interchange; again, this interchange is a cloverleaf interchange with only loop ramps. The turnpike's final exit is Exit 60, a partial interchange with SH-48 southeast of Cleveland. The missing movements are provided by US-64, the northern terminus of SH-48, which merges with US-412 as the Cimarron Turnpike ends. The two routes continue east as the Keystone Expressway, a freeway that connects the turnpike to downtown Tulsa.

History

The Cimarron Turnpike opened to traffic on May 16, 1975, and cost $74 million to construct. On February 1, 1988, the Oklahoma Transportation Commission unanimously approved an extension of US-412 from its original western terminus at Walnut Ridge, Arkansas to Woodward, overlapping the Cimarron Turnpike.

Tolls
, passengers of two-axle vehicles (such as cars and motorcycles) pay a total of $7.45 to travel the entire length of the Cimarron Turnpike. Tolls vary based on the entrance and exit used. The turnpike accepts OTA's Pikepass transponder system as an alternative to PlatePay payment. Pikepass customers receive discounted toll rates; the Pikepass rate for the full length of the Cimarron is $3.30.

As of August 30, 2022, the SH 99 toll plaza at exit 48 has been converted to cashless tolling with PikePass or PlatePay as options. The rest of the turnpike (including the Spur) has been converted to PlatePay as of December 15, 2022.

Toll revenues from the Cimarron Turnpike are not necessarily used to maintain it. Under a practice known as cross-pledging, all OTA toll revenue is pledged against the sum of OTA's indebtedness, including bonds financing the state's other turnpikes.

Services
Law enforcement along the Cimarron Turnpike is provided by Oklahoma Highway Patrol Troop YA, a special troop assigned to the turnpike.

Exit list

State Highway 312

State Highway 312 is an  spur from the Cimarron Turnpike that splits from the main turnpike at exit 27. There is one main lane toll plaza near Perkins Road that costs anywhere between $0.45 (for 2-axle vehicles with a Pikepass) to $2.50 (6-axle vehicles without a Pikepass). The spur's western terminus is at a trumpet interchange with US-177 in northern Stillwater, near Oklahoma State University. There is an incomplete access exit at Perkins Road (signed as exit 21A) and the spur starts to travel through rural areas of northern Payne County before ending at the main turnpike. The spur was built in 1981 at the cost of $4.5 million. The spur was built as a way for westbound traffic to get to Stillwater and the main campus of Oklahoma State University. Conversely, eastbound traffic uses the spur for faster access to Tulsa from Stillwater.

SH-312 originally bore no numbered designation. On August 2, 2021, the Oklahoma Transportation Commission unanimously approved a motion to apply the SH-312 designation to the turnpike. ODOT Director Tim Gatz stated in the Transportation Commission meeting that the numbering addition was primarily to aid in navigation using digital mapping and routing applications.

See also
 Oklahoma Turnpike Authority
 Pikepass

References

External links

 Cimarron Turnpike Toll/Fares Chart - Oklahoma Turnpike Authority

Toll roads in Oklahoma
Transport infrastructure completed in 1975
Transportation in Noble County, Oklahoma
Transportation in Pawnee County, Oklahoma
Transportation in Payne County, Oklahoma
U.S. Route 412